Milecastle 34 (Grindon) was a milecastle of the Roman Hadrian's Wall.

Construction 
Milecastle 34 was a long-axis milecastle with Type II gateways. Such milecastles were thought to have been constructed by the legio XX Valeria Victrix who were based in Deva Victrix (Chester).

Excavations and investigations
1947 – The axis and type are established.

1965 – English Heritage Field Investigation. Lack of visible remains was noted, and the location within the enclosure confirmed.
1988 – English Heritage Field Investigation as part of Hadrian's Wall project. Previous findings were confirmed

Associated turrets 
Each milecastle on Hadrian's Wall had two associated turret structures. These turrets were positioned approximately one-third and two-thirds of a Roman mile to the west of the Milecastle, and would probably have been manned by part of the milecastle's garrison. The turrets associated with Milecastle 34 are known as Turret 34A and Turret 34B.

Turret 34A

Turret 34A (Grindon West) exists as a consolidated structure, and is located in the expected position, just to the east of Sewingshields farm. The cores of both the wall (at this point), and the turret's wing walls are of large whinstone blocks. Outside the turret, a path consisting of small stones and amphora fragments was discovered leading to the door.

The structure was partly dug by FG Simpson in 1913, though results were not published. It was further excavated in 1947 and 1958, and then in 1971 by D Charlesworth, for the Department of the Environment. Finds included a javelin-head, a brooch, a coin of Vespasian, and Samian ware. Three scattered hearths were found (later replaced by one), along with a litter of bones and pot sherds, (mostly from cooking-pots). The recovery of green-glazed ware from the site provided evidence of occupation during the medieval period.

Location on Ordnance Survey 1:25 000 map:  (Ordnance Survey National Grid Coordinates)

Turret 34B
The measured site of Turret 34B is overlaid by a farmhouse at Sewingshields Farm (itself built of Roman stone). Therefore, there are no visible remains.

Predicted location:  (Ordnance Survey National Grid Coordinates)

Monument records

Public access
Both the milecastle and turret 34A are readily accessible from the Hadrian's Wall Path. Having been built over, turret 34B is not accessible.

References

Bibliography

External links

34